Congoglanis alula is a species of loach catfish found in the Congo River Basin in Angola, the Democratic Republic of Congo and possibly in Zambia.  It reaches lengths up to  SL.

References 
 
 Ferraris, C.J. Jr., Vari, R.P. & Skelton, P.H. (2011): A new genus of African loach catfish (Siluriformes: Amphiliidae) from the Congo River basin, the sister-group to all other genera of the Doumeinae, with the description of two new species.  Copeia, 2011: 477–489.

Amphiliidae
Fish of Africa
Fish described in 1917
Taxa named by John Treadwell Nichols
Taxa named by Ludlow Griscom